The United States Customs House and Post Office-Pembina was built in 1932.  It was designed by the Office of the Supervising Architect under James A. Wetmore.  It was listed on the National Register of Historic Places in 1989.

References

Colonial Revival architecture in North Dakota
Government buildings completed in 1932
Post office buildings on the National Register of Historic Places in North Dakota
National Register of Historic Places in Pembina County, North Dakota
Custom houses on the National Register of Historic Places
1932 establishments in North Dakota